Cyclic history or Cyclical history may refer to:

Social cycle theory
Cycle of yugas, ages or stages